John Bingham (born 1948) is an American marathon runner and author, nicknamed "The Penguin", who has achieved widespread recognition for promoting the walking of long-distance race courses to the general public.

Bingham is the author of several books and the No Need for Speed column in Runner's World. He believes that the goals of running are to have fun and finish—and that for a vast majority of amateur athletes running fast should not be the only aim.

His philosophies are often challenged and dismissed by runners, who feel that Bingham's "penguins" have lowered the bar for athletic achievement.

He has completed over 40 marathons and many shorter races.

In June 2014 Bingham announced that he would retire from writing and public speaking at the end of the year.

Bibliography

References

External links
John Bingham's Homepage

American male long-distance runners
American motivational writers
Living people
1948 births
Place of birth missing (living people)
Rodale, Inc.
20th-century American people